In mathematics, specifically in algebraic topology and algebraic geometry,  an inverse image functor is a contravariant construction of sheaves; here “contravariant” in the sense given a map , the inverse image functor is a functor from the category of sheaves on Y to the category of sheaves on X. The direct image functor is the primary operation on sheaves, with the simplest definition. The inverse image exhibits some relatively subtle features.

Definition

We will call the result the inverse image or pullback sheaf .  If we try to imitate the direct image by setting 
 
The best we could do is to approximate it by open sets, and even then we will get a presheaf and not a sheaf. Consequently, we define  to be the sheaf associated to the presheaf:

The restriction maps, as well as the functoriality of the inverse image follows from the universal property of direct limits.

Then the functor  is inappropriate, because in general it does not even give sheaves of -modules. In order to remedy this, one defines in this situation for a sheaf of -modules  its inverse image  by

.

Properties 

  is an exact functor, as can be seen by the above calculation of the stalks.
  is (in general) only right exact. If  is exact, f is called flat.
  is the left adjoint of the direct image functor . These morphisms yield a natural adjunction correspondence:
.

References
 . See section II.4.

Algebraic geometry
Sheaf theory